Heiko Brestrich (born 8 April 1965) is a German football manager and former footballer. 

Brestrich began playing football for the youth teams of BFC Dynamo.  He made regular appearances for the reserve team BFC Dynamo II in the 1984-85 DDR-Liga Nord. Brestrich then made his debut for the first team of BFC Dynamo away against BSG Motor Suhl in the 25th matchday of the 1984-85 DDR-Oberliga on 25 May 1985. He was then allowed to make his international debut for BFC Dynamo away against Austria Wien in the second round of the 1985-86 European Cup on 2 October 1985.  Brestrich made 12 appearances of BFC Dynamo in the 1985-86 DDR-Oberliga. He also made occasional appearances with the first team of BFC Dynamo in the DDR-Oberliga during the following seasons. Brestrich was eventally transferred to BSG Stahl Brandenburg after the 1987-88 season. 

Brestrich returned to BFC Dynamo, now named FC Berlin, at the behining of the 1991-92 season. He would be a key-player in the team of FC Berlin in the following seasons. Brestrich was eventually suspended during the autumn of 1999 and transferred to VfB Leipzig. After a period without sucess, Brestrich rebelled against BFC Dynamo coach Klaus Goldbach. Brestrich was then personally sacked by Club President Volkmar Wanski, who sided with coach Goldbach. 

Breischt has played in a total of 301 matches for BFC Dynamo during his career, including 282 matches between 1991 and 1999. Breich is very popular with the supporters of BFC Dynamo and has popularly been called "Heiko Brestrich - Football God". Former club president Wanski has later described the sacking of Brestrich as his worst moment at BFC Dynamo. After retiring from his professional career, Brestrich has regularly appeared for the traditional team of BFC Dynamo.

References

External links
Career profile

1965 births
Living people
German footballers
East German footballers
Association football sweepers
Berliner FC Dynamo players
CS Grevenmacher players
1. FC Lokomotive Leipzig players
DDR-Oberliga players
FSV Union Fürstenwalde players